Panzer is a surname. Notable people with the surname include:

Jeff Panzer,  American music producer, music video producer and record label executive
Frank E. Panzer, American farmer, schoolteacher, and politician 
Georg Wolfgang Franz Panzer,  German biologist
Marty Panzer, American songwriter
Mary Panzer, American banker and politician, daughter of Frank Panzer
Paul Panzer (1872–1958), German-American silent film actor

German-language surnames